The United Monarchy is a political entity described in the deuteronomistic history of the Hebrew Bible as, under the reigns of Saul, David, and Solomon, encompassing the territories of both the later Kingdom of Judah and Samarian Kingdom of Israel. Whether the United Monarchy actually existed is a matter of ongoing academic debate, and scholars remain divided between those who support the historicity of the biblical narrative, those who doubt or dismiss it, and those who support the kingdom's theoretical existence while maintaining that the biblical narrative is exaggerated.

In the 1990s, Israeli archaeologist Israel Finkelstein contested that existing archaeological evidence for the United Monarchy in the 10th century BCE should actually be dated to the 9th century BCE. This model placed the biblical kingdom in Iron Age I, suggesting that it was not functioning as a country under centralized governance but rather as tribal chiefdom over a small polity in Judah, disconnected from the north's Israelite tribes. The rival chronology of Israeli archaeologist Amihai Mazar places the relevant period beginning in the early-10th century BCE and ending in the mid-9th century BCE, addressing the problems of the traditional chronology while still aligning pertinent findings with the time of Saul, David, and Solomon. Both Mazar's chronology and the traditional one have received fairly wide acceptance, though there is no current consensus on the topic. Recent archaeological discoveries by Israeli archaeologists Eilat Mazar and Yosef Garfinkel in Jerusalem and Khirbet Qeiyafa, respectively, seem to support the existence of the United Monarchy, but the dating and identifications are not universally accepted.

According to the biblical account, on the succession of Solomon's son Rehoboam, the United Monarchy would have split into two separate kingdoms: the Kingdom of Israel in the north, containing the cities of Shechem and Samaria; and the Kingdom of Judah in the south, containing the city of Jerusalem and the Jewish Temple.

Historical sources

According to standard source criticism, several distinct source texts were spliced together to produce the current Books of Samuel. The most prominent in the early parts of the first book are the pro-monarchical source and the anti-monarchical source. In identifying both sources, two separate accounts can be reconstructed. The anti-monarchical source describes Samuel as having thoroughly routed the Philistines, begrudgingly accepting the people's demand for a ruler and appointing Saul by cleromancy.

The pro-monarchical source describes the divinely-appointed birth of Saul (a single word being changed by a later editor so that it referred to Samuel) and his leading of an army to victory over the Ammonites, which resulted in the clamouring of the people for him to lead them against the Philistines, when he is appointed king.

Several scholars believe the Books of Samuel exhibit too many anachronisms to have been a contemporary account. For example, there is mention of later armour (1 Samuel 17:4–7, 38–39; 25:13), use of camels (1 Samuel 30:17), cavalry (as distinct from chariotry) (1 Samuel 13:5, 2 Samuel 1:6), and iron picks and axes (as if they were common) (2 Samuel 12:31).

Most scholars believe that Samuel was compiled in the 8th century BCE, rather than the 10th century, when most of the events described took place, based on both historical and legendary sources. It served primarily to fill the gap in Israelite history after the events that had been described in Deuteronomy.

Archaeological record 
In 1995 and 1996, Israel Finkelstein (Tel Aviv University) published two papers where he proposed a Low Chronology for the stratigraphy of Iron Age Israel. Finkelstein's model would push stratigraphic dates assigned by the conventional chronology by up to a century later, and consequently, Finkelstein concluded that much of the monumental architecture characterizing Israel in the 10th century BCE that has been traditionally associated with the biblical United Monarchy instead belongs to the 9th century. Finkelstein wrote that "Accepting the Low Chronology means stripping the United Monarchy of monumental buildings, including ashlar masonry and proto-Ionic capitals" According to Israel Finkelstein and Neil Silberman, the authors of The Bible Unearthed, ideas of a united monarchy are not accurate history but "creative expressions of a powerful religious reform movement" that are possibly "based on certain historical kernels." Finkelstein and Silberman accept that David and Solomon were real kings of Judah around the 10th century BCE, but they cite the fact that the earliest independent reference to the Kingdom of Israel dates to about 890 BCE and that to the Kingdom of Judah dates to about 750 BCE. Some see the united monarchy as fabricated during the Babylonian Exile transforming David and Solomon from local folk heroes into rulers of international status. Finkelstein has posited a potential United Monarchy under Jeroboam II in the 8th century BC, whereas the former one was potentially invented during the reign of Josiah to justify his territorial expansion.

Finkelstein's views have been strongly criticized by Amihai Mazar (Hebrew University of Jerusalem); in response, Mazar proposed the Modified Conventional Chronology which places the beginning of the Iron IIA period in the early 10th century and its end in the mid-9th century, solving the problems of the High Chronology while still dating the archeological discoveries to the 10th century BCE. Finkelstein's Low Chronology and views about the monarchy have received strong criticism from other scholars, including Amnon Ben-Tor, William G. Dever, Kenneth Kitchen, Doron Ben-Ami, Raz Kletter and Lawrence Stager.

Amélie Kuhrt (University College London) acknowledges that "there are no royal inscriptions from the time of the united monarchy (indeed very little written material altogether), and not a single contemporary reference to either David or Solomon," but she concludes, "Against this must be set the evidence for substantial development and growth at several sites, which is plausibly related to the tenth century." Kenneth Kitchen (University of Liverpool) reaches a similar conclusion, arguing that "the physical archaeology of tenth-century Canaan is consistent with the former existence of a unified state on its terrain."

On August 4, 2005, archaeologist Eilat Mazar announced that she had discovered in Jerusalem what may have been the palace of King David. Now referred to as the Large Stone structure, Mazar's discovery consists of a public building she dated from the 10th century BCE, a copper scroll, pottery from the same period, and a clay bulla, or inscribed seal, of Jehucal, son of Shelemiah, son of Shevi, an official mentioned at least twice in the Book of Jeremiah. In July 2008, she also found a second bulla, belonging to Gedaliah ben Pashhur, who is mentioned together with Jehucal in Jeremiah 38:1. Amihai Mazar called the find "something of a miracle". He has said that he believes that the building may be the Fortress of Zion that David is said to have captured. Other scholars are skeptical that the foundation walls are from David's palace. Garfinkel also claimed to have discovered David's palace in 2013, 25 kilometers away.

Excavations at Khirbet Qeiyafa, an Iron Age site in Judah, found an urbanized settlement radiocarbon dated well before scholars such as Finklestein suggest that urbanization had begun in Judah, which supports the existence of an urbanised kingdom in the 10th century BCE. The Israel Antiquities Authority stated, "The excavations at Khirbat Qeiyafa clearly reveal an urban society that existed in Judah already in the late eleventh century BCE. It can no longer be argued that the Kingdom of Judah developed only in the late eighth century BCE or at some other later date." The techniques and interpretations to reach some conclusions related to Khirbet Qeiyafa have been criticized by some scholars, such as Finkelstein and Alexander Fantalkin of Tel Aviv University.

In 2010, archaeologist Eilat Mazar announced the discovery of part of the ancient city walls around the City of David which she believes date to the tenth century BCE. According to Mazar, "It's the most significant construction we have from First Temple days in Israel" and "It means that at that time, the 10th century, in Jerusalem there was a regime capable of carrying out such construction." The 10th century is the period the Bible describes as the reign of King Solomon. Not all archaeologists agree with Mazar and archaeologist Aren Maeir is dubious about such claims and about Mazar's dating.

In the Jewish Study Bible (2014), Oded Lipschits states the concept of United Monarchy should be abandoned, while Aren Maeir believes there is insufficient evidence in support of the United Monarchy. In August 2015, Israeli archaeologists discovered massive fortifications in the ruins of the ancient city of Gath, supposed birthplace of Goliath. The size of the fortifications show that Gath was a very large city in the 10th century BCE, perhaps the largest in Canaan at the time. The professor leading the dig, Aren Maeir, estimated that Gath was as much as four times the size of contemporary Jerusalem, which cast doubt that David's kingdom could have been as powerful as described in the Bible.

In his book, The Forgotten Kingdom (2016), Israel Finkelstein considered that Saul, originally from the Benjamin territory had gained power in his natal Gibeon region around the 10th century BCE, and that he conquered Jerusalem in the south and Shechem to the north, creating a polity dangerous to Egypt's geopolitical intentions. So, Shoshenq I, from Egypt, invaded the territory and destroyed this new polity, and installed David of Bethlehem in Jerusalem (Judah) and Jeroboam I in Shechem (Israel) as small local rulers which were vassals of Egypt. Finkelstein concludes that the memory of a united monarchy was inspired by the Saul's conquered territory serving first the ideal of a great united monarchy ruled by a northern king in the times of Jeroboam II, and next to the ideal of a united monarchy ruled from Jerusalem.

In an article on the Biblical Archaeology Review, William G. Dever (Lycoming College) strongly criticized Finkelstein's theory, calling it as full of "numerous errors, misrepresentations, over-simplifications and contradictions". Dever noted that Finkelstein is proposing that Saul ruled a polity extending as far north as Jezreel and as far south as Hebron and reaching a border with Gath, whereas a capital was located in Gibeon rather than Jerusalem: according to Dever, such a polity is a united monarchy in its own right, ironically confirming the biblical tradition. In addition, he rejected the notion that Gibeon was the capital of such polity, since there is "no clear archaeological evidence of occupation in the tenth century, much less monumental architecture." Dever went as far as to dismiss Finkelstein's theory as "a product of his fantasy, stemmed by his obsession to prove that Saul, David and Solomon were not real kings and that the United Monarchy is an invention of a Judahite biased biblical writer". Dever concluded by stating that "Finkelstein has not discovered a forgotten kingdom, he has invented it. The careful reader will nevertheless gain some insights into Israel—Israel Finkelstein, that is."

Another, more moderate, review was written on the same magazine by Aaron Burke, (University of California): Burke described Finkelstein's book as "ambitious" and praised its literary style, but did not accept his conclusions: according to Burke, Finkelstein's thesis is mainly based on his proposed Low Chronology, ignoring the criticism that it has received by scholars like Amihai Mazar, Christopher Bronk Ramsey and others, and engages in several speculations that cannot be proved by archeology, biblical and extra-biblical sources. He also criticized him for persistently trying to downgrade the role of David in the development of ancient Israel.

In his books, Beyond the Texts (2018) and Has Archeology Buried the Bible? (2020), William G. Dever has defended the historicity of the United Monarchy, maintaining that the reigns of Saul, David and Solomon are "reasonably well attested". Similar arguments were advanced by Amihai Mazar in two essays written in 2010 and 2013, which point toward archaeological evidence emerged from excavation sites in Jerusalem by Eilat Mazar and in Khirbet Qeiyafa by Yosef Garfinkel.

In 2018, archaeologist Avraham Faust (Bar-Ilan University) announced that his excavations at Tel 'Eton (believed to be the biblical Eglon) had uncovered an elite house (which he referred to as "the governor's residency"), whose foundations were dated by Carbon-14 analysis in the late 11th–10th century BCE, the time usually ascribed to Saul, David and Solomon. Such dating would strengthen the thesis that a centralized state was already existing in the time of David.

Biblical narrative

Origin

According to the Book of Judges, before the rise of the united monarchy the Israelite tribes lived as a confederation under ad hoc charismatic leaders, called judges. Abimelech, the first judge to be declared king by the men of Shechem and the house of Millo (Bet Millo), reigned over Israel for three years until he was killed during the Battle of Thebez.

According to the biblical account, the united monarchy was formed by a large popular expression in favour of introducing a king to rule over the decentralised Israelite confederacy. Increasing pressure from the Philistines and other neighboring peoples is said to have forced the Israelites to unite as a state after the anointing of Saul by Samuel. The notion of kingship is treated as having been anathema and viewed as the placing of one man in a position of reverence and power that ought to be reserved for God.

According to the Second Book of Samuel, Saul's disobedience prompts God to curtail his reign and to hand his kingdom over to another dynasty, leading to Saul's death in battle against the Philistines. His heir, Eshbaal, rules for only two years before being assassinated. David was king of Judah only but ends the conspiracy and is appointed king of Israel in Eshbaal's place. Some textual critics and biblical scholars suggest that David was actually responsible for the assassination and that his innocence was a later invention to legitimise his actions.

Israel rebels against David and appoints David's son Absalom king. David is forced into exile east of the Jordan but eventually launches a successful counterattack, which results in the loss of Absalom. Having retaken Judah and asserted control over Israel, David returns west of the Jordan.

Golden age
Prior to the ascension of Saul, the city of Shiloh is seen as the national capital, at least in the religious sense. From an archaeological standpoint, the claim is considered to be plausible. Throughout the monarchy of Saul, the capital is in Gibeah. After Saul's death, Eshbaal rules over the Kingdom of Israel from Mahanaim, and David establishes the capital of the Kingdom of Judah in Hebron.

After the civil war with Saul, David forges a strong and unified Israelite monarchy, rules from c. 1000 to 961 BCE. Some modern archaeologists, however, believe that the two distinct cultures and geographic entities of Judah and Israel continued uninterrupted, and if a political union between them existed, it might have had no practical effect on their relationship.

In the biblical account, David embarks on successful military campaigns against the enemies of Judah and Israel and defeats such regional entities as the Philistines to secure his borders. Israel grows from kingdom to empire, its military and political sphere of influence expanding to control the weaker client states of Philistia, Moab, Edom and Ammon, with Aramaean city-states Aram-Zobah and Aram-Damascus becoming vassal states.

David is succeeded by his son Solomon, who obtains the throne in a somewhat-disreputable manner from the rival claimant Adonijah, his elder brother. Like David's Palace, Solomon's temple is designed and built with the assistance of Tyrian architects, master craftsmen, skilled labourers, money, jewels, cedar and other goods obtained in exchange for land ceded to Tyre.

Solomon goes on to rebuild numerous major cities, including Megiddo, Hazor and Gezer. Some scholars have attributed aspects of archaeological remains excavated from this sites, including six-chambered gates and ashlar palaces, to the building programme. However, Israel Finkelstein's Low Chronology would propose to down-date them to the 9th century BCE. Yigael Yadin later concluded that the stables that had been believed to have served Solomon's vast collection of horses were actually built by King Ahab in the 9th century BCE.

Collapse and split

Following Solomon's death in c. 926 BCE, tensions between the northern part of Israel, containing the ten northern tribes, and the southern section, dominated by Jerusalem and the southern tribes, reached a boiling point. When Solomon's son and successor, Rehoboam, dealt tactlessly with economic complaints of the northern tribes, in about 930 BCE (there are differences of opinion as to the actual year) the Kingdom of Israel and Judah split into two kingdoms: the northern Kingdom of Israel, which included the cities of Shechem and Samaria, and the southern Kingdom of Judah, which contained Jerusalem.

The Kingdom of Israel (or the Northern Kingdom or Samaria) existed as an independent state until 722 BCE, when it was conquered by the Neo-Assyrian Empire. The Kingdom of Judah (or the Southern Kingdom) existed as an independent state until 586 BCE, when it was conquered by the Neo-Babylonian Empire.

Biblical chronology

Many alternative chronologies have been suggested, and there is no ultimate consensus between the different factions and scholarly disciplines concerned with the period as to when it is depicted as having begun or when it ended.

Most biblical scholars follow either of the older chronologies established by American archaeologists William F. Albright and Edwin R. Thiele, or alternatively the newer chronology of Israeli historian Gershon Galil. Thiele's chronology generally corresponds with Galil's chronology below, with a difference of one year at most.

See also
 History of ancient Israel and Judah
 Historicity of the Bible
 Chronology of the Bible
 List of Jewish states and dynasties

References

Notes

Citations

Sources

 
 
 
 

 
10th-century BC disestablishments
11th-century BC establishments
 
David
Former countries in Western Asia
Israel, United Monarchy
Israel
Political entities in the Land of Israel
Solomon
States and territories established in the 11th century BC
States and territories disestablished in the 10th century BC